Angelo Vaccarezza (born 1965) is an Italian politician.

Biography 
Vaccarezza became involved in politics as a young man, having taken up a local council post after periods of service at the Teletrill communications firm and a brief period as a broker. He became involved in the Forza Italia movement, supporting the leadership of Claudio Scajola.

Political career 
Vaccarezza has been involved in politics in Loano for 21 years, first as a councillor and later as an assessor; he was on 30 May 2006 elected to a second term as mayor of the city with a 60% share of the vote. In provincial elections in June 2009 he scored a ballot victory over Democratic Party candidate Michele Boffa to become President of the Province of Savona.

References

External links 
 

1965 births
Living people
Presidents of the Province of Savona